Marcel Canadi (born 27 October 1997) is an Austrian professional footballer who plays for Brisbane Roar.

Club career
He made his Austrian Football First League debut for SC Austria Lustenau on 8 September 2017 in a game against TSV Hartberg.

On 11 August 2020 he signed a two-year contract with SV Ried.

Personal life
His father Damir Canadi is a football manager and a former player.

References

External links
 

1997 births
Living people
Austrian footballers
Austrian expatriate footballers
Austrian people of Serbian descent
Austrian people of Croatian descent
Expatriate footballers in Germany
Borussia Mönchengladbach II players
SC Austria Lustenau players
SKU Amstetten players
SV Ried players
Brisbane Roar FC players
Regionalliga players
Austrian Football Bundesliga players
2. Liga (Austria) players
Association football midfielders